Honduras as the most of the Central American countries, took part for the first time in the OTI Festival in the edition of 1974, which was held in the Mexican coastal city of Acapulco. TNH (Televisión Nacional de Honduras), the OTI member broadcaster of that country selected Moisés Canelo as their first entrant, who achieved a respectable ninth place. After a withdrawal in 1975, the Honduran broadcaster rejoined the event and participated every year till the last show, which was held again in Acapulco.

History 
As many Central American countries in the OTI Festival, Honduras didn't really have a successful participation in the contest. In fact, TNH never managed to get a victory for Honduras during their history in the event, but reached the top ten on six occasions.

In 1976 Wilson Reynoot and his song "Por cantarle al mar" (For singing to the sea) placed eighth in Acapulco.

In 1978 in Santiago, the singer Domingo Trimarchi also placed eighth with the song "Por esas pequeñas cosas" (For those little things), a song written by the successful Mexican composer Chucho Ferrer.

One year later, in Caracas, Honduras placed seventh with Gloria Janeth and the song "Hermano hispanoamericano" (Hispanic American brother), which is considered to be a call for Latin American unity and solidarity.

Moisés Canelo, the first Honduran contestant, who placed ninth for TNH in 1974, returned to the contest five years later in 1980 in Buenos Aires, Argentina, placing seventh with his song "Tú, siempre tú (You, Always you). One year later, in Mexico City, the Honduran delegation placed seventh for the third time with Oneyda and the song "Ven" (Come). Since then, Honduras struggled in the contest and never managed to get a top ten place again.

Contestants

References 

OTI Festival
Honduran music